Mukunda is a given name. Notable people with the given name include:

Mukunda Das (1878-1934), Bengali poet
Mukunda Goswami (born 1942), American Hindu leader
Mukunda Hari Shrestha (born 1955), Nepalese long-distance runner
Mukunda Michael Dewil, South African film director
Mukunda Neupane, Nepalese trade unionist and politician
Mukunda Prasad Das, physicist
Mukunda Ram Choudhury (born 1949), Indian politician
Mukunda Ram Mandal, Indian politician
Mukunda Sharan Upadhyaya (born 1940), Nepali poet and linguist

Given names